Thomas Welpley (c. 1483 – 1534 or later), of Bath, Somerset, was an English politician.

He was a Member (MP) of the Parliament of England for Bath in 1529. He was Mayor of Bath in 1530.

References

1480s births
16th-century deaths
English MPs 1529–1536
Mayors of Bath, Somerset